Joshua Ian Gray (born 22 July 1991) is an English footballer who is unattached after being released by Darlington. He plays as a winger.

Career

Football 
Gray made his debut for Darlington in an FA Cup first-round game with Droylsden on 8 November 2008, as a late substitute. The game finished 0–0. He made his league debut four months later as one of four teenagers among the squad for a 1–0 victory against Notts County at the Darlington Arena, one week after the club entered administration. His first league goal came in April 2010 in a 2–1 League Two victory against Burton Albion at the Pirelli Stadium. On 11 February 2011, Gray joined Blyth Spartans on a month-long loan. Gray was released by Darlington in June 2011. Since 2013/14 he has played for Consett AFC.

Doctorate 
Following on from his football career Gray took an access course at Gateshead College and went onto study Biomedical Science at Northumbria University where he gained a BSc. Upon receiving his degree, Gray undertook a PhD in immunology at the University of Glasgow in the laboratory of Dr Megan MacLeod. His thesis entitled "Molecular Mechanisms of Antigen-specific Memory CD4 T Cell Tolerance and the Implications for Tolerogenic Therapy" was successfully defended on 7 June 2019. Upon receiving his doctorate Gray moved to New York to undertake postdoctoral research at Columbia University.

References

External links

1991 births
Living people
English footballers
Association football wingers
Darlington F.C. players
Blyth Spartans A.F.C. players
Consett A.F.C. players
English Football League players
National League (English football) players
Footballers from South Shields